Snowville may refer to:
 Snowville, Utah
 Snowville, New Hampshire
 Snowville, Virginia